Sovana Cathedral is a Roman Catholic cathedral in Sovana, now a frazione of the town of Sorano, in the province of Grosseto, region of Tuscany, Italy, dedicated to Saint Peter. Formerly the episcopal seat of the Diocese of Sovana (from 1844 the Diocese of Sovana e Pitigliano, and from 1981 the Diocese of Sovana-Pitigliano-Orbetello), since 1986 it has been a co-cathedral in the diocese of Pitigliano-Sovana-Orbetello.

History
Tradition holds that Sovana was made a bishopric in the 5th century. A church on the site, still evident in the crypt, was founded in the 8th to 9th centuries and documented in a bull by Pope Nicholas II in 1061. It was reconstructed in Romanesque architectural style in 1248.

See also
 History of medieval Arabic and Western European domes

References

Roman Catholic cathedrals in Italy
13th-century Roman Catholic church buildings in Italy
Romanesque architecture in Tuscany
Churches in the province of Grosseto
Cathedrals in Tuscany
Sorano
Sovana